The 2000 London Broncos season was the twenty-first in the club's history and their fifth season in the Super League. The club was coached by John Monie, competing in Super League V and finishing in 11th place. The club also got to the fifth round of the Challenge Cup.

2000 squad statistics

Sources: London Broncos

Super League V table

Sources: SL stats - 2000 Summary

2000 Challenge Cup
The year after reaching their maiden Final, the Broncos were knocked out of the cup at the fifth round stage.

References

External links
London Broncos - Rugby League Project

London Broncos seasons
London Broncos